Arild Verner Agerskov Mikkelsen (October 21, 1928 – November 21, 2013) was an American professional basketball player. One of the National Basketball Association's first power forwards in the 1950s, he was known for his tenacious defense.  Also an ironman, he played in 699 out of a possible 704 during his career. He was a six-time All-Star and four-time Second Team All-Pro, and was inducted into the NAIA Basketball Hall of Fame and the sport's Naismith Memorial Basketball Hall of Fame in 1995.

Along with fellow Hall of Famers George Mikan and Slater Martin he was a key part of four championships with the Minneapolis Lakers, today's Los Angeles Lakers.

Mikkelsen was also an All-American in college, and earned a master's degree from the University of Minnesota.

Early life
Mikkelsen was born in Parlier, California and was raised in the Danish-American community of Askov, Minnesota. His father, Michael, was an immigrant from Denmark who became a Lutheran pastor in Askov.

College career 
Mikkelsen entered Hamline University in Saint Paul, Minnesota on a basketball scholarship at the age of 16. In his senior year, Mikkelsen led NCAA Division II in field goal percentage. Hamline won the 1949 NAIA Division I men's basketball tournament and Mikkelsen was voted an All-American. He would later receive a master's degree in psychology from the University of Minnesota.

Professional career

Minneapolis Lakers (1949-1960) 
Mikkelsen played with George Mikan and Jim Pollard in the frontcourt of the Minneapolis Lakers. The Lakers won four NBA titles during Mikkelsen's career.  Mikkelsen played in six NBA All-Star Games and was named to the All-NBA Second Team four times in his career.

Mikkelsen ended his career after ten seasons in the NBA in 1959, having played in 699 of a possible 704 regular-season games. He led the NBA in both personal fouls and fouling out of games for three straight seasons during his career, and finished his career with 10,063 points scored.  Mikkelsen still holds the league record for career games fouling out with 127, which he did in only 631 games (the NBA did not record that statistic until his second season).

Honors and awards
In 1956, Mikkelsen was inducted into the NAIA Basketball Hall of Fame.

Mikkelsen was inducted into the Naismith Memorial Basketball Hall of Fame in 1995 along with Laker coach John Kundla.

In 2002, during halftime of a Lakers/Timberwolves game, Mikkelsen and fellow Hall of Fame teammates George Mikan, Slater Martin, Arlee Pollard (widow of Jim Pollard), Clyde Lovellette and Coach John Kundla were each presented with championship rings.  The Minneapolis players received the same rings provided by the NBA to the champion Los Angeles Lakers that same year.

Coaching
Mikkelsen later coached and was general manager of the Minnesota Pipers of the American Basketball Association.

Personal life and family
Mikkelsen's wife Jean died in 2002 after 47 years of marriage. Their two sons are named Tom and John. In 2006 a biography was published by John Egan titled The Vern Mikkelsen Story.

Mikkelsen died on November 21, 2013, in Wayzata, Minnesota surrounded by his family.

NBA career statistics

Regular season

Playoffs

Notes

External links

Vern Mikkelsen profile  @ LakersWeb.com
Vern Mikkelsen career stats at Basketball-Reference.com

1928 births
2013 deaths
American Basketball Association executives
American men's basketball coaches
American men's basketball players
American people of Danish descent
Basketball coaches from California
Basketball coaches from Minnesota
Basketball players from California
Basketball players from Minnesota
Hamline Pipers men's basketball players
Minneapolis Lakers draft picks
Minneapolis Lakers players
Minnesota Pipers coaches
Naismith Memorial Basketball Hall of Fame inductees
National Basketball Association All-Stars
National Collegiate Basketball Hall of Fame inductees
People from Parlier, California
People from Pine County, Minnesota
Power forwards (basketball)
Small forwards
Sportspeople from Fresno County, California
University of Minnesota College of Liberal Arts alumni